Noer Muhammad Iskandar (5 July 1955 – 13 December 2020) was an Indonesian Islamic cleric (kyai) who also the head and the founder of the Ash-Shiddiqiyah Islamic Boarding School. He was also often invited to fill the dawah programme on national television.

He was well known as a kyai who found the pesantren which applies the santris intellectualization principle, that a santri must be able to understand the symbols of the Koran as more than just understanding God's commands, but must be returned to the actualization steps in everyday life. In his time, this principle was contrasted with the Koran teaching in the pesantren which was only dogmatic and on the other hand in the secular schools, the Koran was taught in a rationalistic approach. He founded the Ash-Shiddiqiyah pesantren in 1985.

Personal life and education
He was born in the village of Sumber Beras, Banyuwangi, East Java. He was the ninth of eleven children from the couple Iskandar and Robiatun. His father was also a kyai.

He was married to Siti Nur Jazilah in 1982. His wife is a daughter of Mashudi, a kyai from Tumpang, Malang. His wedding was witnessed by the kyais from Lirboyo, Kediri and Tebuireng, Jombang, Makhrus Aly, and Adlan Aly, respectively.

Death
He died on 13 December 2020.

References

1955 births
2020 deaths
Indonesian Islamic religious leaders